Joseph Anthony Foy (February 21, 1943 – October 12, 1989) was an American professional baseball player who played third base in Major League Baseball.

Boston Red Sox
Born in New York City, Foy was signed as an amateur free agent by the Minnesota Twins in 1962, then was later selected in that year's minor league draft by the Boston Red Sox.

Playing with the Toronto Maple Leafs in the International League in 1965, Foy was voted the Most Valuable Player and Rookie of the Year, and also won the league's batting title, hitting .302.

His first year in the majors, with Boston in 1966, was arguably his best season. Foy batted a solid .262, drew the second-most walks in the American League (91), had a .364 on-base percentage, good for eighth in the junior circuit; he also scored 97 runs, fifth in the league. As pitching became more dominant in the late 1960s, Foy's numbers dropped considerably.

In 1967, while receiving over 100 fewer at-bats, Foy batted a slightly worse .251/.325/.426 (his walk total halved), although the league did drop by 4 batting points, 2 on-base points, and 18 slugging points. On a positive note, Foy set a career-high for home runs with 16.

In 1968, the infamous "Year Of The Pitcher" (when Carl Yastrzemski led the league with a .301 batting average, and the American League batted just .230), Foy did well at the plate. While his raw stats (.225/.336/.326) seemed unimpressive, his on-base percentage was 39 points above the league average, and his slugging and batting averages were roughly the same as the league average. He stole 26 bases that year and drew 84 walks.

Kansas City Royals
The Red Sox left Foy unprotected in the 1968 expansion draft where the Kansas City Royals selected him with the fourth pick. He had a fine season in 1969. While the league still only batted .246/.321/.369, Foy's numbers were .262/.354/.370. He also had 71 runs batted in, his career-high.

Then, in a move considered by some to be one of the best trades in Royals history, Kansas City traded Foy to the third baseman-hungry Mets for Amos Otis and Bob Johnson. Otis developed into an All-Star, and an occasional MVP candidate. The Royals then traded Johnson the following year, after a 200 strikeout season, to the Pittsburgh Pirates for shortstop Fred Patek, who became another cornerstone of their rising franchise.

New York Mets

Foy posted a career-best .373 OBP while hitting .236/.373/.329 with 6 home runs and 37 RBI in 322 at-bats with New York.

His best day with the Mets, and perhaps of his entire career, came on July 19, 1970 when he went 5-for-5 with a double, two home runs, and five runs batted in as the Mets edged the Giants, 7–6, in 10 innings at San Francisco.

Although his averages were not that far off from his career average, Foy was considered a disappointment to Mets fans. Additionally, according to Mets pitcher Jerry Koosman, Foy fell under the influence of his old friends in the Bronx. In the first game of one doubleheader, Koosman and others thought he was high on some kind of drug (eventually confirmed to be marijuana), especially when he walked in front of manager Gil Hodges in the dugout during a pitch and started cheering. Still, Hodges started him at third base in the second game. The first batter hit a hard ground ball by Foy. He never even saw it, but even after it went by him, he kept punching his glove and yelling, "Hit it to me, hit it to me." Koosman and others all wanted Foy out right then, but according to Koosman, Hodges left Foy in the game just a little longer to show that he didn't fit on the team.

After the season, the Mets left him off the roster, and the Washington Senators drafted him in the Rule 5 draft.

Washington Senators
Foy was only an average batter with the Senators batting .234/.363/.297 in 128 at-bats. He was sent to the minors in May. After batting .191 in 15 games, he was released on July 16, 1971 and never played in another professional baseball game.

Towards the end of his career, he battled substance abuse which had, most unfortunately, hindered his on field performance as a player, carrying over into his post-baseball years.

Foy would later serve as a counselor for troubled youth in his native New York-area.

Death
He died as the result of a heart attack at his home in New York on October 12, 1989, at the early age of 46, and was interred in Woodlawn Cemetery in the Bronx.

References

External links
, or Retrosheet, or SABR Biography Project

1943 births
1989 deaths
African-American baseball players
Boston Red Sox players
Burials at Woodlawn Cemetery (Bronx, New York)
Cangrejeros de Santurce (baseball) players
Denver Bears players
Erie Sailors players
Florida Instructional League Red Sox players
International League MVP award winners
Kansas City Royals players
Lehman College alumni
Liga de Béisbol Profesional Roberto Clemente infielders
Major League Baseball third basemen
New York Mets players
Reading Red Sox players
Seattle Rainiers players
Sportspeople from the Bronx
Baseball players from New York City
Tigres de Aragua players
American expatriate baseball players in Venezuela
Toronto Maple Leafs (International League) players
Washington Senators (1961–1971) players
Wellsville Red Sox players
Winston-Salem Red Sox players
20th-century African-American sportspeople